Stenopterus is a genus of beetles belonging to the family Cerambycidae, subfamily Cerambycinae. Species of this genus are present in most of Europe, in the Near East and in North Africa.

Selected species
 Stenopterus adlbaueri Sama, 1995
 Stenopterus ater (Linnaeus, 1767)
 Stenopterus atricornis Pic, 1891
 Stenopterus creticus Sama, 1995
 Stenopterus flavicornis Küster, 1846
 Stenopterus mauritanicus Lucas, 1846
 Stenopterus rufus (Linnaeus, 1767)
 Stenopterus similatus Holzschuh, 1979
 Stenopterus similatus mehli Sama, 1995
 Stenopterus similatus similatus Holzschuh, 1979

External links
 Fauna Europaea
 Biolib

Stenopterini
Beetles of Europe